Vladimir David Bigorra López (born August 9, 1954) is a retired football defender from Chile, who represented his native country at the 1982 FIFA World Cup, wearing the number four jersey. He played for several clubs in Chile, including Universidad de Chile. After his active football career Bigorra became a football manager.

Career
After he retired from playing in 1992, Bigorra spent several years coaching the Chile national team at various youth levels. He enjoyed success, leading the Chile national under-17 football team to the 1997 FIFA U-17 World Championship finals in Egypt.

Bigorra would later manage Chilean clubs, including Deportes Puerto Montt during 2001.

References

 Weltfussball profile

External links

1954 births
Living people
Chilean football managers
Chilean footballers
Cobresal footballers
Universidad de Chile footballers
Association football defenders
Chile international footballers
1982 FIFA World Cup players
Place of birth missing (living people)
Unión Española managers
Chile national under-20 football team managers